The Second Federal Electoral District of Campeche (II Distrito Electoral Federal de Campeche) is one of the 300 Electoral Districts into which Mexico is divided for the purpose of elections to the federal Chamber of Deputies and one of two such districts in the state of Campeche.

It elects one deputy to the lower house of Congress for each three-year legislative period, by means of the first past the post system.

District territory
Campeche's Second District  covers the municipalities of Carmen, Champotón, Escárcega, Palizada and Candelaria.

The district's head town (cabecera distrital), where results from individual polling stations are gathered together and collated, is the city of Ciudad del Carmen.

Deputies returned to Congress from this district

L Legislature
 1976–1979: Jorge Muñóz Icthé (PRI)
LI Legislature
 1979–1982: José Edilberto Vázquez Ríos (PRI)
LII Legislature
 1982–1985: Abelardo Carrillo Zavala (PRI)
LIII Legislature
 1985–1988:
LIV Legislature
 1988–1991:
LV Legislature
 1991–1994:
LVI Legislature
 1994–1997: Gabriel Escalante Castillo (PRI)
LVII Legislature
 1997–2000: Aracely Escalante Jasso (PRI)
LVIII Legislature
 2000–2003: Ricardo Augusto Ocampo Fernández (PRI)
LIX Legislature
 2003–2006: Sebastián Calderón Centeno (PAN)
LX Legislature
 2006–2009: Arturo Martínez Rocha (PRI)

References

Federal electoral districts of Mexico
Campeche